The First Battle of Oituz was fought between 12 and 27 October 1916 between the Kingdom of Romania on one side and Austria-Hungary and the German Empire on the other. It was part of the Romanian operations for the defense of the passes in the Carpathians. The objectives of the operation were to resist the enemy attack on the Transylvanian front, to obtain and maintain a defensive device in the Carpathian alignment and to create the conditions for an eventual counter-offensive. At the end, the Central Powers (Germany and Austria-Hungary) failed to defeat the Romanian forces and the battle was a victory for the latter.

The Austro-Hungarian forces were commanded by Charles I of Austria, heir to the Austro-Hungarian throne, while the German army was commanded by General Erich von Falkenhayn. On the other hand, the Romanian commanders were Eremia Grigorescu and Nicolae Sinescu.

References

Conflicts in 1916
1916 in Romania
Battles of World War I involving Austria-Hungary
Battles of World War I involving Germany
Battles of World War I involving Romania
October 1916 events